A. ovalis may refer to:
 Alopecosa ovalis, a wolf spider species found in Inner Mongolia in the People's Republic of China
 Amelanchier ovalis, the snowy mespilus, a shrub species
 Anadara ovalis, the blood ark clam, a clam species found along the Atlantic coast of North America, ranging from Massachusetts to the West Indies and Brazil
 Ancilla ovalis, a sea snail species

See also
 Ovalis (disambiguation)